The Orb is the name of two supervillains appearing in American comic books published by Marvel Comics, primarily adversaries of Ghost Rider.

Publication history
The Drake Shannon version of Orb debuted in Marvel Team-Up #15 (November 1973) and was created by writer Len Wein and artist Ross Andru.

The second Orb first appeared in Ghost Rider (vol. 6) #26 (October 2008) and was created by Jason Aaron and Tan Eng Huat.

The Orb appeared as one of the villains in the 2014 crossover story Original Sin, which involved the theft of the eyes of the Watcher. Writer Jason Aaron said, "It was Tom [Breevort]'s ideally initially to use the Orb; no one will believe me on that, though. Using him is an obvious idea, but something I didn't think of until Tom mentioned it. Tom's thinking, rationally so, was that since we were doing a story which revolves around eyeballs being stolen then using a villain who got an eyeball for a head was perfect."

Fictional character biography

Drake Shannon

Drake Shannon was born in Wheeling, West Virginia. An accomplished motorcycle stunt rider, he owned one-half of the traveling motorcycle stunt show which would later feature Johnny Blaze (who would later become Ghost Rider). The other half of the show was owned by Blaze's mentor, Crash Simpson.

While the partnership was initially amiable, the two men grew apart and eventually an intense rivalry developed. Neither wanted to work with the other, but neither wanted to sell their half of the show.  To settle the dispute, the two men agreed to a lengthy race, with the winner receiving full ownership of the traveling show.

After many miles of neck-and-neck competition, Shannon deliberately swerved towards Simpson in an effort to force Simpson to crash. However, the maneuver caused Shannon to lose control of his motorcycle. While Simpson managed to remain upright and continue on with the race, Shannon slid 25 yards on his unprotected face. The accident left him hideously disfigured.

After his recovery, for reasons never adequately explained, Shannon was given a powerful motorcycle helmet by They Who Wield Power. The helmet, which was modeled to look like a giant eyeball, could hypnotize people. A later version could also shoot powerful laser beams from its "pupil".

Calling himself "the Orb", Shannon attempted to take over the traveling motorcycle stunt show which he had once half-owned. He put the lives of dozens of innocent people at risk, but informed Johnny Blaze (now the sole owner of the stunt show) that he would let them go unharmed in exchange for the sole ownership of the stunt show. Although Blaze capitulated, Shannon instructed his minions to kill the hostages anyway, so that no one would know how the ownership changed hands. At this point, Ghost Rider and Spider-Man teamed up to defeat him.

Becoming a professional criminal, he returned several times, always plotting to get revenge on the Ghost Rider. The Orb attacked Delazny Studios, and battled the Ghost Rider again. He inflicted Roxanne Simpson with amnesia, and battled Ghost Rider once more. He was later revealed to have been a pawn of "They Who Wield Power." Alongside Madame Menace, he battled Ghost Rider once again. At one point he also crossed paths with Hawkeye. The Orb battled Hawkeye, and alongside Hawkeye he discovered Plantman's mobile plant-growing factory, and was shot by Plantman's stimuloids.

Agent of Zadkiel

A successor to the original Orb, he was born with a head that resembled a giant eye and was abandoned at a young age and grew up in a freak show.

After performing a number of unidentified jobs, this Orb was hired to take down Caretaker alongside Blackout II, Death-Ninja and Doghead. Blackout alleged that the Orb was killed by the Caretaker, but it was later revealed that he was merely hospitalized with massive eye trauma.

He is later one of the villains considered by Blackout and the Deacon to help them assassinate the Ghost Rider. He was later broken out of prison and began to work for Zadkiel. During the climactic confrontation with the Ghost Riders, the Orb had the fingers of his left hand shot off and was again returned to the prison hospital as a cellmate of the paralyzed Deacon.

This second Orb was notable for the fact that he almost never stopped talking (much to the frustration of both his teammates and his enemies) and that while he always boasted of his prowess with his repulsor ray, he never actually successfully hit anyone with it.

Orb resurfaced in the Astonishing Spider-Man & Wolverine miniseries, robbing a bank. He was sent skipping through time by some glowing diamonds. Eventually, he gained some understanding of time travel but was apprehended by the Minutemen before he could put this knowledge to use.

Orb later appeared with a group of minions in eye-based masks, having just stolen the eyes of a group of people at a bank. Clearly insane, he claimed that he rolled around naked in eyeballs, regarding the eyes as 'windows to the soul' that he could gather power from before his rematch with the Ghost Rider. He claimed that he could see the true selves of the Hulk and Red She-Hulk when he looked into their eyes, describing Betty's conflicting relationship with her father and recognizing that a 'monster' was behind Hulk's eyes that was not the Hulk himself.

In the wake of Uatu the Watcher's murder in the 2014 miniseries "Original Sin", Orb and Exterminatrix are discovered to be in possession of one of Uatu's gouged-out eyes,  but after he is captured, he maintains that he did not commit the murder. Doctor Strange and Punisher then take Orb to a satellite, where Orb collapses due to his body's absorption of the things he stole from Uatu's home. As the storyline concludes, the Orb has merged with one of Uatu's eyes, which now resides in his chest.

Orb reappears trying to steal a future-predicting Rigellian Recorder from Deadpool and the Mercs for Money, claiming that the burden of the Watcher's power has made him want to prevent anyone else from having access to similar capabilities, "because I've seen what that can do to someone!" In the midst of a high-speed highway battle, he and his motorcycle are knocked into the Big Wheel by Merc member Foolkiller.

He returns, having kidnapped Doctor Strange in the "Blood in the Aether" story line, where he is revealed to have regained the Watcher's power, now influencing those he observes to commit more brutal actions (such as telling a loner in an apartment that he is viewed as a creep by others in the building and should kill them in response). This confrontation was interruped by Mordo and Dormammu.

When the Phoenix Force returned to Earth to choose a new host, the Orb was one of the champions selected for the battle, but he lost to Valkyrie in the first "round".

The Orb witnessed the arrival of the multiversal Masters of Evil, but when he declared his intention to watch their actions, he was immediately killed by their leader, Doom Supreme.

Powers and abilities
Drake Shannon is an athletic man with no superhuman powers. He is an expert stunt motorcyclist and a capable hand-to-hand combatant. However, the Orb is criminally insane as a result of the accident which disfigured his face. As the Orb, he wears a helmet originally provided by "They Who Wield Power" composed of unspecified materials, containing specialized micro-circuitry, capable of firing laser blasts and hypnotizing victims. The Orb rides a motorcycle which he specially modified.

The second Orb used a repulsor ray gun. Unlike the original Orb, this Orb's head is an actual giant eyeball. He claims to be able to talk by flexing certain muscles in his 'eye'/head. He has merged with one of the eyes of Uatu, which now resides in his chest.

In other media
The Drake Shannon incarnation of the Orb appears in M.O.D.O.K., voiced by Bill Hader. This version is a bartender at the Bar with No Name and rarely speaks.

References

External links
 
 

Characters created by Len Wein
Characters created by Ross Andru
Comics characters introduced in 1973
Fictional characters from West Virginia
Fictional stunt performers
Marvel Comics supervillains